Theodore I. Fry (July 25, 1881January 28, 1962) was a Michigan politician.

Early life
Fry was born on July 25, 1881, in Fremont, Michigan.

Career
Fry began his career as a teller with the Old Fremont State Bank and was elected Cashier in 1907. At some point, Fry worked as a director for Fremont Canning Company. Fry served as Michigan State Treasurer from 1933 to 1938. Fry was not reelected to this position in 1938. In 1936 and 1940, Fry served as a delegate to Democratic National Convention from Michigan. From 1941 to 1942, Fry once again served as State Treasurer. In 1942, Fry again failed to procure reelection. Fry was a presidential elector in 1944. In 1944 and 1956, Fry served as an alternate delegate to Democratic National Convention from Michigan.

Personal life
Fry was a member of the Freemasons and the Shriners.

Death
Fry died on January 28, 1962, in Gerber Hospital in Fremont.

References

1881 births
1962 deaths
American Freemasons
1944 United States presidential electors
State treasurers of Michigan
People from Fremont, Michigan
Michigan Democrats
20th-century American politicians